R357 road may refer to:
 R357 road (Ireland)
 R357 road (South Africa)